In Boolean algebra, Poretsky's law of forms shows that the single Boolean equation  is equivalent to  if and only if , where  represents exclusive or.

The law of forms was discovered by Platon Poretsky.

References

 , Boolean Reasoning: The Logic of Boolean Equations, 2nd edition, 2003, p. 100
 Louis Couturat, The Algebra Of Logic, 1914, p. 53, section 0.43
 Clarence Irving Lewis, A Survey of Symbolic Logic, 1918, p. 145, section 7.15

External links
 "Transhuman Reflections - Poretsky Form to Solve"

Boolean algebra